Liga ASOBAL 2003–04 season was the 14th since its establishment. A total of 16 teams competed this season for the championship.

Competition format
This season, the competition was played in a round-robin format through 30 rounds. The team with the most points earned wins the championship. The last two teams were relegated.

Overall standing

Top goal scorers

2003
Liga Ascobal
Spain